Josiah Franklin Sr. (December 23, 1657 – January 16, 1745) was an English businessman and the father of Benjamin Franklin. Born in the village of Ecton, Northamptonshire, England, Josiah was the ninth child of blacksmith Thomas Franklin (b. 1598), and his first wife, Jane White. Thomas was the son of Henry Franckline (b. 1573) and Agnes Joanes. Thomas Franklin remarried and had more children. Josiah Franklin worked as a fabric dyer in Ecton. Franklin immigrated to the American colonies in 1682. He married twice and had 17 children: ten boys and seven girls. In Boston, he was a member of the Congregational Old South Church where he served as a tithingman.

Marriage to Anne Child
Josiah Franklin married his first wife, Anne Child, in 1677 and they had seven children: Lawrence, Elizabeth, Samuel, Hannah, Josiah Jr., Joseph (1688–1688), Joseph II (1689–1689). Anne died from complications giving birth to Joseph II. Upon moving to Boston, Josiah took up the trade of tallow chandler and soap boiler because the trade he was born to was not in demand in New England.

Marriage to Abiah Folger
In November 1689, Josiah Franklin married his second wife, Abiah Folger, in the Old South Church. Abiah of Nantucket, Massachusetts, was the daughter of Peter and Mary Morrill Foulger. Peter Foulger was a schoolmaster, a miller and a surveyor.

Abiah bore Josiah 10 children: John (1690), Peter (1692), Mary (1694), James (1697), Sarah (1699), Ebenezer (1701), Thomas (1703), Benjamin (1706), Lydia (1708), and Jane (1712).

Benjamin Franklin
Josiah insisted that each of his sons must learn a trade. He had great dreams of Benjamin becoming a minister, but Josiah could only afford to send his son to school for two years. As his young Benjamin loved to read, Josiah apprenticed him to his brother James, who was a printer. Later, Benjamin Franklin borrowed books from his friends and taught himself arithmetic, grammar, and philosophy. Benjamin had a very strong relationship with his father, who had a great influence on Benjamin.

References

Benjamin Franklin
1657 births
1745 deaths
Burials at Granary Burying Ground
Kingdom of England emigrants to Massachusetts Bay Colony
People from Ecton, Northamptonshire